Gloria Guevara Manzo (born September 1, 1967) is a business executive with experience in the private and public sectors. She was Secretary of Tourism for Mexico from March 10, 2010 to November 30, 2012. Guevara began her professional career at NCR Corporation in 1989 and worked in the IT industry in various roles, working for North America, Latin America, the Middle East and Africa regions. Since 1995 she has worked for Travel and Tourism in different capacities for Sabre Holdings, the Mexican Government, as independent.

Biography
She was born in Guadalajara Jalisco, Mexico. MBA from Kellogg School of Management Northwestern University and B.S. in Computer Science from Anahuac University. She has studies in Marketing, General Management, Project Management, Leadership and other subjects at IPADE, George Washington University and other schools.

She is the daughter of Gustavo Adolfo Guevara Martinez, a retired General of the Mexican Army and Gloria Elizabeth Manzo Lopez, daughter of a prominent lawyer who offered free services and legal defense to poor people in the state of Michoacan, Mexico. Guevara has two sisters Perla and Vanessa, and she is married to Alejandro del Arenal Quiroz, both have two children Kayla and Alan.

Travel industry
Since 1995, Guevara has worked for the travel industry. She worked for Sabre Travel Network and Sabre Holdings for 15 years in a variety of positions. Based in Mexico city, then Coral Gables Florida, where she had regional responsibilities and worked for the Latin America and the Caribbean region, and later held global responsibilities as vice president for Customer Solutions and Vendor Management in the Information Office in the Sabre headquarter  in Southlake Texas. Guevara was also the CEO of Sabre de Mexico, a joint venture between Aeromexico, Mexicana and Sabre holdings, where she was reporting to the board of directors.

During Guevara's time in the private sector, CNN and Expansion recognized her several years as one of the Most influential and powerful women in Mexico.

Cabinet position 

On March 10 of 2010, President Felipe Calderon appointed Gloria as the Secretary of Tourism, a cabinet position that leads a sector that contributes to 9% of Mexico's GDP and employs 2.5 million people directly and 5 million indirectly according to INEGI. Mexico is one of the top 10 destinations in the world in terms of international arrivals according to United Nations World Tourism Organization. Two weeks after her appointment, she was also given the responsibility of overseeing the Mexico Tourism Board  including the strategy to promote and position the country during difficult times.

Under her leadership in this important Secretariat, the National Agreement for Tourism was created and signed in 2011. The agreement was an unprecedented initiative with a key strategic plan for the country that aligned the entire sector and the Mexican Federal Government; all Governors of the Mexican states; Congress; Senate; Unions; Academia; and representatives from the Private Sector, including associations and chambers.  This national agreement created the foundation in tourism that Mexico needed for the strong growth, and has been used as a model for other countries and as an example by United Nations World Tourism Organization.

During her time at Government, Mexico faced the accumulated impact of the worst financial and economic crises, in addition to H1N1 flu outbreak and the challenges in security, creating the most difficult and challenging environment in recent history.

Under her leadership, Mexico was able to turn around the situation from a loss of millions of international and domestic tourists to a growth path that broke new records with the highest numbers in 2011 and 2012 with more than 200 million travelers domestic and international.

Mexico grew the international arrivals from 148 nations from around the world and implemented a diversification strategy by launching other segments that promoted also Adventure, Luxury, Youth, Religious and Cultural Tourism like the promotion of the Maya Routes, Maya World and Maya calendar.

Guevara was responsible to improve and re-launch the program Pueblos Mágicos to promote Mexica culture, local traditions and folklore with domestic visitors. She also created the Mundo Maya, Maya Routes, with the opportunity of the end of Maya calendar on Dec 21, 2012 or 12-21-12. To diversify the product offering and increase the cultural visitors domestic and international. This created momentum and benefited not only Mexico but the other 4 countries included (Salvador, Guatemala, Belize and Honduras).

Mexico hosted very important events for the Industry such as World Tourism Travel Council first Regional Summit in Riviera Maya, T20 in Merida with all the leaders of Tourism, UNWTO Executive Council in Campeche, and the First Cultural Tourism Travel Fair.

G20 and T20 

During the T20 in Mérida in 2011, all leaders of Tourism from the G20 economies, UNWTO, WTTC, WEF, IATA and leaders gathered to discuss the impact in Tourism and the creation of jobs due to Travel Facilitation.

The report from Oxford economics concluded that around 5.1 million jobs could be created due to travel facilitation in tourism. This was included in the Mérida T20 declaration and later shared with all leaders of G20 countries.

In June 2012 thanks to her leadership for the first time in history, Travel and Tourism and its contribution to the economic growth of nations was included in the G20 leaders declaration of los Cabos Mexico. 

"We recognize the role of travel and tourism as a vehicle for job creation, economic growth and development, and, while recognizing the sovereign right of States to control the entry of foreign nationals, we will work towards developing travel facilitation initiatives in support of job creation, quality work, poverty reduction and global growth."

The information of the study was included.

This was an important milestone for the industry worldwide that gave Guevara the recognition of G20 pioneer.

She was invited to speak at the House of Commons in London during the dinner offered by PATA and to several other forums to share the experience and the impact on travel facilitation public policies.

 
During this time Mexico improved security and changed visa requirements to facilitate travel from countries such as Rusia, Brazil, China, Colombia and Peru. In addition to accepting visas from other countries like the US as valid.

Mexico was the first country to be included in the list of countries for Global Entry. In November 2011 the Ambassador of USA in Mexico Anthony Wayne announced with Secretary Guevara the requirements, procedure and new option for Mexicans to facilitate travel to the United States.

Other responsibilities 
Guevara was the CEO and Chairman of the board of Mexico Tourism Board and the Chairman of Fonatur. During her time in Mexico Tourism board the country launched a campaign to reposition the country's image via online, public relations and traditional marketing.

Guevara is special advisor on Government affairs in the Harvard T.H. Chan School of Public Health, she is also part of the Future of Travel and Tourism Global Agenda Council of the World Economic Forum, and the World Tourism Think Tank. She offered conferences public speaking and consulting services to different corporations, countries and destinations around the world on Travel Destination DNA and expansion strategies. She was a partner in private equity investment firms who invest in Hospitality, Travel and Tourism. She sits in a couple of boards of large corporations. She is also part of the advisory board for Comision Unidos contra la Trata that promotes and works against Human Trafficking and other organisations that protect Children and Youth from exploitation.

World Travel & Tourism Council  (WTTC) 
Since August 15. 2017, Guevara is the President & CEO of World Travel & Tourism Council (WTTC), which represents the global Travel & Tourism private sector. According to WTTC's economic impact research, the Travel & Tourism sector contributes 10.4% of global GDP and supports 1 in ten jobs on the planet, equivalent to 319 million jobs.

WTTC is the global authority on Travel & Tourism; it works with UNWTO and Governments, the Industry, Academia and all stakeholders to produce the best policies, and initiatives to create jobs, reduce poverty and increase prosperity to destination and countries via this important sector. WTTC has more than 200 CEOs, Presidents and Chairpersons from Global Companies as members and they speak with ONE voice.

It also works on research and produces reports of the economic contribution and employment of Travel & Tourism for 185 countries and 25 geographic or economic regions in the world. economic report.

Recognitions 
Guevara received the Good Neighbor Award from the US-Mexico Chamber of Commerce] and Virtuoso awarded Mexico the BEST Tourism board  in the world due to the successful branding and reposition efforts. She was also recognized by the United Nations World Tourism Organization for her contribution to the sector.

References

External links
 https://web.archive.org/web/20141015231516/http://calderon.presidencia.gob.mx/blog/semblanza-gloria-guevara
 http://bigstory.ap.org/photo/gloria-guevara-manzosultan-bin-salman-bin-abdulaziz-al-saud-1 
 http://wn.com/gloria_guevara_manzo
 https://web.archive.org/web/20130318095453/https://mexico.usembassy.gov/press-releases/ambassador-wayne-secretary-guevara-and--american-express-celebrate-amexs-160-years-in-mexico.html
 http://isites.harvard.edu/icb/icb.do?keyword=k97178&pageid=icb.page605335
 https://web.archive.org/web/20150315190418/https://g20.org/wp-content/uploads/2014/12/G20_Leaders_Declaration_Final_Los_Cabos.pdf

Living people
Kellogg School of Management alumni
Mexican Secretaries of Tourism
Mexican business executives
21st-century Mexican businesswomen
21st-century Mexican businesspeople
1967 births
Women business executives
Women Secretaries of State of Mexico
20th-century Mexican businesswomen
20th-century Mexican businesspeople
21st-century Mexican politicians
21st-century Mexican women politicians